Giovanni-Guy Yann Sio (born 31 March 1989) is a professional footballer who plays as a forward for Swiss Super League club FC Sion. Born in France, he represented the Ivory Coast at international level.

Career
Born in Saint-Sébastien-sur-Loire, Sio began his career with Nantes and joined Real Sociedad B in the summer of 2007, after Nantes released him. In the summer of 2008, he was promoted to the Segunda División team. Sio signed a two-year deal with an option for a third year.

On 2 September 2009, Swiss club Sion signed the French forward from Real Sociedad. On 29 May 2011 Sio scored the first goal as Sion defeated Neuchâtel Xamax FCS 2-0 in the Swiss Cup Final.

In January 2012, he joined VfL Wolfsburg for a fee reported as €5 million, signing a four-year deal, keeping him until 2016. He was sent to FC Augsburg on 10 July 2012 on loan, until the end of the 2012–13 campaign. The loan was ended prematurely on 31 January 2013.

On 16 August 2013, it was announced that Sio had joined Basel on a four-year contract. Basel joined the 2013–14 Champions League in the qualifying rounds and Sio played his debut for his new club as they played an away game in the play-off round on 21 August. He scored his first goal with the team in the same game as Basel won 4–2 against Ludogorets Razgrad. Sio played his domestic league debut three days later in the away game in the Swissporarena. He scored his first league goal in the same game as Basel played a 1–1 draw with Luzern. At the end of the 2013–14 Super League season Sio won the league championship with Basel. The team also reached the final of the 2013–14 Swiss Cup, but were beaten 2–0 by Zürich after extra time. Basel advanced to the Champions League group stage and finished in third place in the group table. Thus they qualified qualified for Europa League knockout phase and here they advanced as far as the quarter-finals. But here they were eventually beaten by Valencia 5-3 on aggregate, after extra time.

For Basel's 2014–15 season Paulo Sousa was appointed as new head coach and it was a very successful season for the team. However, it was difficult season for Sio under the new head coach. Despite the fact that Basel won the championship later that season for the sixth time in a row and that Basel had entered the Champions League in the group stage reaching the knockout phase on 9 December 2014, as they managed a 1–1 draw at Anfield against Liverpool, Sio totaled just 16 appearances during the first half of the season, 7 (of 18) League, 2 (of 3) in the Cup and just 1 (of 6) in the Champions League, as well 6 further appearances in test games. Because Sousa did not rely upon Sio as a regular player, during February 2015, the club loaned Sio out to Ligue 1 team SC Bastia until the end of the season.

After his loan period Sio did not return to Basel. During his time with the club, Sio played a total of 59 games for Basel scoring a total of 16 goals. 30 of these games were in the Swiss Super League, five in the Swiss Cup, 13 in the UEFA competitions (Champions League and Europa League) and 11 were friendly games. He scored 10 goals in the domestic league, two in the cup, two in the European games and the other two were scored during the test games.

On 29 June 2015 the Basel announced that Sio was moving on to Rennes.

On 29 September 2018, Sio was loaned to Al-Ittihad Kalba SC with an €1.6m option to buy.

In November 2021 it was announced that Sio had signed for Sion.

International career
Sio was born and raised in France to Ivorian parents. He is also a former member of the France national youth football team, representing his country at U-15, U-16 and U-17. He was also called up to the Ivory Coast U-20 squad for the 2010 Toulon Tournament. He had his first call-up to the Ivory Coast national team in 2013, in a 2014 World Cup qualifying match against the Gambia. He represented the team at the 2014 World Cup.

Career statistics

Club

International goals
Scores and results list Ivory Coast's goal tally first.

Honours 
Sion
Swiss Cup: 2010–11

References

External links
 
 

1989 births
Living people
Footballers from Loire-Atlantique
Ivorian footballers
Ivory Coast international footballers
French footballers
France youth international footballers
French sportspeople of Ivorian descent
Association football forwards
2014 FIFA World Cup players
2017 Africa Cup of Nations players
Black French sportspeople
Segunda División players
Ligue 2 players
Swiss Super League players
Bundesliga players
Ligue 1 players
UAE Pro League players
Süper Lig players
FC Basel players
FC Sochaux-Montbéliard players
FC Nantes players
Real Sociedad footballers
FC Sion players
VfL Wolfsburg players
FC Augsburg players
SC Bastia players
Stade Rennais F.C. players
Montpellier HSC players
Al-Ittihad Kalba SC players
Gençlerbirliği S.K. footballers
French expatriate footballers
Expatriate footballers in Spain
Expatriate footballers in Switzerland
Expatriate footballers in Germany
Expatriate footballers in Turkey
Expatriate footballers in the United Arab Emirates
French expatriate sportspeople in Spain
French expatriate sportspeople in Switzerland
French expatriate sportspeople in Germany
French expatriate sportspeople in Turkey
French expatriate sportspeople in the United Arab Emirates